Artistic, mosaic or architectural video walls are video walls that do not follow a more traditional grid or matrix pattern.  Instead of the more common configuration of 2x2 or 3x3, artistic video walls allow users to display a single image, video or display canvas across displays arranged ad hoc and at different angles. This allows users to design unusual configurations: EX. layouts that attract attention, or serve as a unique artistic feature in a public space.

Source rotation 

The simplest approach to a 'unique' video wall is to rotate the source content which allows end users to rotate the actual displays.  By using a mix of portrait and landscape displays this allows users to deploy a video wall that is not a simple matrix, however this approach is limited to keeping all displays at the same angle.

Any angle rotation 

Any angle rotation allows individual displays to rotate to any angle allowing greater flexibility in the video wall lay out.

Mix of display types and sizes 

An additional feature of some video walls is the ability to mix display sizes and types.  Instead of requiring a set of uniform displays, users can mix and match displays of different sizes and aspect ratio.

Artistic video wall comparison

References

Video art